This is a non-exhaustive list of Andorra women's international footballers – association football players who have appeared at least once for the senior Andorra women's national football team.

Players

See also 
 Andorra women's national football team

References 

 
Lists of Andorra international footballers
Andorra
Association football player non-biographical articles